Nina Kunzendorf (born November 10, 1971) is a German actress.  Her credits include the television series Tatort and the films Phoenix, Woman in Gold and Unspoken.

Early life
Kunzendorf was born in Mannheim, Baden-Württemberg.

External links
 

Living people
German film actresses
German television actresses
21st-century German actresses
1971 births
Actors from Mannheim